is a Japanese naval officer who served as the Self Defense Fleet's Commander of the Japanese Maritime Self Defence Force (JMSDF) from 2012 to 2014. He is the 46th Commander of the Self-Defense Fleet, succeeding Katsutoshi Kawano. In 2014, he was succeeded by Eiichi Funada.

Career
Born in Osaka Prefecture in 1955. He graduated from National Defense Academy (22nd term). He later became the Commander of the 2nd Escort Group, Commander of the Training Squadron, Deputy Principal of the Maritime Self-Defense Force Executive School, Chief of the Sasebo District General Manager, Chief of the Self-Defense Fleet Command and Commander of the Escort Fleet.

On 26 July 2012, he became the 46th Commander of the Self-Defense Fleet.

On 27 March 2014, he was retired from the Navy and became an advisor to Mitsubishi Electric Corporation.

Awards
 
 2nd Defensive Memorial Cordon

 3rd Defensive Memorial Cordon

 10th Defensive Memorial Cordon

 11th Defensive Memorial Cordon

 13th Defensive Memorial Cordon

 18th Defensive Memorial Cordon

 19th Defensive Memorial Cordon

 20th Defensive Memorial Cordon

 21st Defensive Memorial Cordon

 22nd Defensive Memorial Cordon

 26th Defensive Memorial Cordon

 32nd Defensive Memorial Cordon

 33rd Defensive Memorial Cordon

 36th Defensive Memorial Cordon

 41st Defensive Memorial Cordon

 Legion of Merit

See also
Japanese military ranks

References

1955 births
People from Osaka Prefecture
Military personnel from Osaka Prefecture
Living people